Mallosia tamashaczi is a species of beetle in the family Cerambycidae. It was described by Sama and Székely in 2010. It is known from Iran.

References

Saperdini
Beetles described in 2010